Ronni Hawk is an American actress. She is known for playing Rachel Diaz in the Disney Channel comedy series Stuck in the Middle, and for playing Olivia on the Netflix comedy series On My Block.

Life and career
Hawk began dancing at the age of five. When she turned twelve, she began to appear in various commercials. She soon began modeling in Florida until her coach suggested she expand into acting, so she and her family moved to Los Angeles to pursue roles.

After starring in a series of short films, in 2016, Hawk landed the role of Rachel Diaz in the Disney Channel series Stuck in the Middle, a role she found relatable as she herself came from a large family. She was part of the main cast for the first two seasons, then part of the way through the series' third season, she left the show with her character having left to attend college in Paris while doing a fashion internship.

In 2018, Hawk was cast as Olivia in the Netflix series On My Block, which she played during its first season. In the same year, she appeared as Tiffany in an episode of the crime-drama series S.W.A.T.

In 2020, she played Wendy on the supernatural-drama series Legacies for two episodes.

Filmography

References

External links
 
 

21st-century American actresses
American television actresses
Living people
People from Boca Raton, Florida
Year of birth missing (living people)
Actresses from Florida